Ziridava baliensis is a moth in the family Geometridae. It is found on Bali and Flores.

References

Moths described in 1958
Eupitheciini